Luís Martins may refer to:
 Luís Martins (footballer, born 1963), Portuguese football manager
 Luís Martins (footballer, born June 1992), Portuguese footballer
 Luís Martins (footballer, born October 1992), Portuguese footballer
 Luís Carlos Martins (born 1955), Brazilian professional football manager
 Luís Paixão Martins (born 1954), Portuguese communication and public relations consultant